Noyelles-sous-Lens (literally Noyelles under Lens) is a commune in the Pas-de-Calais department in northern France.

Administration
Noyelles-sous-Lens belongs to the Agglomeration community of Lens – Liévin, which consists of 36 communes, with a total population of 250,000 inhabitants.

History
The Courrières mine disaster on March 10, 1906, affected Noyelles-sous-Lens.

Population

Twin towns
Noyelles-sous-Lens is twinned with:
 Szczecinek, Poland since 1983
 Roundstone, Ireland since 2004

Notable people
Noyelles-sous-Lens was the birthplace of Edita Piekha (born 1937), Russian actress and singer of French and Polish heritage.

See also
Communes of the Pas-de-Calais department

References

External links

 Town council website 
 Communaupole website 

Noyellessouslens
Artois